Bemo may refer to:

Vehicles
 Bemo (taxi), share taxis and autorickshaws in Indonesia
 Daihatsu Midget, also marketed as the Bemo
 John Douglas Bemo (1824-1890) Seminole Christian missionary

See also
 Beemo or BMO, a character in the animated TV series Adventure Time
 BMO (disambiguation)